How to Fight in Six Inch Heels (Vietnamese: Am Muu Giay Got Nhon) is a 2013 Vietnamese romantic comedy film directed by Ham Tran, and starring Kathy Uyen, who also produced and co-wrote the film based on her own source material, originally written to improve her acting prospects in Vietnam.

The film, made in Vietnam and New York City, had its U.S. premiere on 13 March 2014 at CAAMFest in San Francisco.

The film had its official US Theatrical Release on March 29, 2015 in Orange County, San Jose, Houston, Dallas, San Diego and Seattle.

Plot 
Anne is a talented fashion designer who is having a happy life in New York. She owns a stable career and has a fiancé who loves her wholeheartedly. Kiet - Anne's fiancé comes to Vietnam for his business trip.

While chatting via Skype with Kiet, she discovers a red pair of heels in his house. Suspecting that Kiet is cheating, Anne decides to fly to Vietnam to clear everything out.

In Vietnam, she meets her close friend Danny. Anne has a list of 3 suspects including Bao Trang, Mimi and Ha My. The three are models so Anna wants to investigate each of them.

Danny advises Anne that if she wants to meet them, she needs to enter showbiz by becoming a model. Danny trains her afterward, she picks Thai An as her stage name and gradually becomes well-known leading her to get close to 3 suspects.

In one event, Anna exposes everything which causes Ha My a scandal, later Anne discovers that Kiet and Ha My are just friends. This incident disappoints Kiet so he breaks up with Anne.

Back to the US, Anne is fired however she is happy that finally, she is free. Anne comes back to Vietnam in order to apologize Ha My. Shortly after, she holds a fashion show and makes up with Kiet afterward.

Cast 

 Kathy Uyen as Anne / Thai An
 Don Nguyen as Danny
 Petey Majik Nguyen as Kiet
 Truc Diem as Ha My
 Phuong Mai as Bao Trang
 Yaya Truong Nhi as Mimi
 Mai The Hiep as Huy
 Kieu Minh Tuan as Store Manager
 Hua Vi Van as Tuan (Ha My's boyfriend)
 Sigmund Watkins as George (Anne's colleague)
 Gigi Velicitat as Tino (Anne and George's boss)
 Antoneus Maximus as Rapper Antoneus Maximus
 Thanh My as Bao Trang's daughter
 Bui Vu Long as Binh

Reception
The film grossed 7.5 billion đồng in its first 4 days of release in Vietnam.

References

External links

Kathy Uyen's website
Sydney Morning Herald review

2013 films
2013 romantic comedy films
Films directed by Ham Tran
Vietnamese-language films
Vietnamese romantic comedy films